Carolina Meligeni Rodrigues Alves (born 23 April 1996) is a Brazilian tennis player. She is the niece of former tennis player Fernando Meligeni and sister of tennis player Felipe Meligeni Alves.

Alves has career-high rankings of 165 in singles, achieved on 12 September 2022, and world No. 110 in doubles, achieved on 18 July 2022. She has won five singles and 22 doubles titles on tournaments of the ITF Circuit.

Alves made her WTA Tour main-draw debut at the 2015 Rio Open in the doubles event, partnering Ingrid Gamarra Martins.

Grand Slam performance timeline

Singles

WTA 125 tournament finals

Doubles: 1 (runner-up)

ITF Circuit finals

Singles: 16 (5 titles, 11 runner-ups)

Doubles: 39 (22 titles, 17 runner–ups)

References

External links
 
 
 
 

1996 births
Living people
Brazilian female tennis players
Tennis players from São Paulo
Sportspeople from Montevideo
Pan American Games medalists in tennis
Pan American Games bronze medalists for Brazil
Tennis players at the 2019 Pan American Games
Medalists at the 2019 Pan American Games